In mathematics, a Bessel process, named after Friedrich Bessel, is a type of stochastic process.

Formal definition

The Bessel process of order n is the real-valued process X given (when n ≥ 2) by

where ||·|| denotes the Euclidean norm in Rn and W is an n-dimensional Wiener process (Brownian motion).
For any n, the n-dimensional Bessel process is the solution to the  stochastic differential equation (SDE)

where W is a 1-dimensional Wiener process (Brownian motion).  Note that this SDE makes sense for any real parameter  (although the drift term is singular at zero).

Notation

In specific dimensions
For n ≥ 2, the n-dimensional Wiener process started at the origin is transient from its starting point: with probability one, i.e., Xt > 0 for all t > 0.  It is, however, neighbourhood-recurrent for n = 2, meaning that with probability 1, for any r > 0, there are arbitrarily large t with Xt < r; on the other hand, it is truly transient for n > 2, meaning that Xt ≥ r for all t sufficiently large.

For n ≤ 0, the Bessel process is usually started at points other than 0, since the drift to 0 is so strong that the process becomes stuck at 0 as soon as it hits 0.

Relationship with Brownian motion 
0- and 2-dimensional Bessel processes are related to local times of Brownian motion via the Ray–Knight theorems.

The law of a Brownian motion near x-extrema is the law of a 3-dimensional Bessel process (theorem of Tanaka).

References

Williams D. (1979) Diffusions, Markov Processes and Martingales, Volume 1 : Foundations. Wiley. .

Stochastic processes